The City and District of St Albans is a local authority district in Hertfordshire in the East of England region. The main urban settlements are St Albans and Harpenden. The council offices are in St Albans.

History

St Albans City and District is a non-metropolitan district and city created on 1 April 1974 as a merger of the Municipal Borough of St Albans, the Harpenden Urban District and most of St Albans Rural District. The municipal borough had had city status since 1877 and it was granted to the entire district by letters patent on 9 July 1974.

Geography
The district is in the west of Hertfordshire, bounded on the north west by Luton, on the north east by North Hertfordshire, on the east by Welwyn Hatfield, on the south by Hertsmere, on the south west by Watford and Three Rivers and on the west by Dacorum. The largest urban settlement is St Albans, followed in size by Harpenden, with lesser settlements at Redbourn, Wheathampstead, London Colney, Chiswell Green and Bricket Wood. Nearby towns include Hatfield to the east, Welwyn Garden City to the northeast, Luton and Dunstable to the northwest, Hemel Hempstead to the west, Watford to the southwest and Borehamwood to the south.

Communications
The M1 motorway, the M25 motorway, the A414 road and A1081 road run through the district. There are rail routes to London St Pancras from St Albans City railway station and to Watford from St Albans Abbey railway station.

Governance
Local government responsibilities are divided among Hertfordshire County Council, St Albans City and District Council and local parish councils. Hertfordshire County Council is responsible for education, transport, fire and public safety, social care and libraries. The district council has a wide range of responsibilities including electoral services, food safety, licensing, car parks, allotments, cemeteries, grounds maintenance, leisure and theatre facilities (in Council's ownership) museums, parks and open spaces, markets, street cleaning, management and maintenance of council owned housing, the administration of housing benefits, planning applications, building control, local development framework and spatial planning. Parish council responsibilities include allotments, youth projects, leisure facilities, open spaces, traffic calming and community transport schemes.

District council

The main offices of St Albans City and District Council are in St Albans. There are 56 elected councillors, representing twenty electoral wards. 18 wards elect three councillors each; two elect two each. Since 2021, the Liberal Democrats have had control of the council. Its present (2022) composition is: Liberal Democrats – 50, Conservative – 4; Green Party – 1; Independent – 1. The party group leaders are: Liberal Democrats – Chris White; Conservatives – Brian Ellis;  Independent and Green – Simon Grover.

Electoral wards
Electoral wards were update in 2022 as part of a Boundary Review by the Boundary Commission.

Electoral history

Elections to the council are held in three out of every four years, with one third of seats on the council being elected at each election. Since the first election in 1973, the Conservative party and the Liberal Democrats have had periods in control. The Conservatives had a majority from 1973 to 1984, and then again from 1988 to 1991 after a period of no overall control. The Liberal Democrats won control in 1994 but lost their majority in 1999. They had control from 2006 to 2007 and from 2008 to 2011. In the 2011 election the Conservatives took half the seats, with 29 councillors. The Conservatives won a majority in the 2015 election which they held until 2019. The Liberal Democrats regained control in the 2021 election, which was delayed from 2020 due to the COVID-19 pandemic.

Mayoralty
St Albans has had a Mayor for over 450 years since the Charter of 1553. Under modern arrangements, there is an Executive Cabinet of eight senior councillors and the Mayor's role is purely ceremonial. A list of past Mayors is available on the St Albans City and District Council website.

Parish councils
There are parish councils in Colney Heath, Harpenden, Harpenden Rural, London Colney, Redbourn, St Michael, St Stephen (including the villages of Chiswell Green and Bricket Wood), Sandridge and Wheathampstead. The city of St Albans is unparished but local affairs are overseen by a City Neighbourhoods Committee.

Economy
The City and District of St Albans has a strong local economy, is an excellent location for rail, road and airports, and is seen by many employers as a desirable place to be. The District also benefits from the proximity of the University of Hertfordshire, based close by at Hatfield, which is one of the country's leading business orientated universities.

St Albans has a highly skilled workforce, with the 4th highest proportion of managers, senior officials and professional occupations in the country. Nearly half of working age residents have a degree or equivalent qualification. Average weekly earnings are £724.40, 44% higher than the national average. The St Albans District has lower than average unemployment and the lowest in Hertfordshire. 2.8% of residents are disabled or permanently sick, compared with 5–6% nationally.

Deloitte, Spreadex, AECOM, PricewaterhouseCoopers and Premier Foods have offices in the district. Sainsbury's Retail Distribution Centre at London Colney employs over 600 staff.

Demography
In 2001 St Albans City and District had a population of 129,005 (50.8% female, 49.2% male). The mid 2012 population estimate was 138,800. By the time 2021 Census the population had risen to 148,167, with 75,167 females and 72,296 males. In 2001 there were 20.5% children, 64.5% people of working age (16–64) and 14.9% older people (65+). 86.9% of St Albans residents are White British, 4.3% Other White, 2% Irish and 1.3% Bangladeshi. 71% identify as Christian, 24.1% as "no religion" or "religion not stated", 2.6% as Muslim and 0.9% as Jewish.

Twin towns
St Albans is twinned with:
 Fano, Italy
 Nyíregyháza, Hungary
 Nevers, France
 Odense, Denmark 
 Worms, Germany
 Nieuwleusen, Netherlands
 Sylhet, Bangladesh

In addition, there are friendship links with:
 HMS St Albans (F83)

Arms

See also
 St Albans Museums

References

External links
 St Albans District Council official website

 
Cities in the East of England
Districts of Hertfordshire
Borough Council
Boroughs in England